The Genoese Lighthouse is a lighthouse and historic monument situated on the waterfront of the city of Constanța, Romania behind a group of statues which has in its center the bust of Mihai Eminescu, sculpted by Oscar Han. It is located near Constanța Casino.

The lighthouse stands approximately eight meters high and is rectangular at its base to a height of about three and a half meters, and is octagonal above that. The interior of the lighthouse is cylindrical, with a spiral staircase in stone. The structure itself stands upon a pedestal base consisting of two steps, and is finished at the top with brackets supporting the eaves, upon which the metal housing of the lantern room also forms the roof.

The original lighthouse was built around 1300 by the Genoese who traded at the port, to guide ships at sea from a range of about two nautical miles out to the small port of Constanța. It was rebuilt between 1858-1860 by French-Armenian engineer Artin Aslan, by order of the British-owned Danube and Black Sea Railway Company, to honor the Genoese merchants who established a flourishing sea trade community.

See also 
Italians in Romania

References

External links 
 Location of the Genoese Lighthouse on an interactive map of Constanța 

Buildings and structures in Constanța
Historic monuments in Constanța County
Lighthouses in Romania